A constitutional referendum was held in Somalia on 25 August 1979. The new constitution replaced the one approved in 1961, and introduced a one-party state with a presidential system of government. It was approved by 99.78% of voters.

Results

References

1979 in Somalia
1979 referendums
Elections in Somalia
Referendums in Somalia
Constitutional referendums
August 1979 events in Africa